Alessandro Capra (born 1620, date of death unknown) was an Italian architect and inventor. He was born in Cremona.

He studied architecture under Giacomo Erba. He invented a number of machines. From 1672 to 1682, he published three volumes on geometry and civil and military architecture. His two sons, Giusto and Domenica, worked on a number of hydraulic inventions.

Works

References

1620 births
Year of death missing
Architects from Cremona
17th-century Italian architects
17th-century Italian engineers